Crapatalus is a genus of southern sandfishes native to the coastal waters of Australia and New Zealand.

Species
There are currently three recognized species in this genus:
 Crapatalus angusticeps (F. W. Hutton, 1874) (Slender stargazer)
 Crapatalus munroi Last & Edgar, 1987 (Robust pygmy-stargazer)
 Crapatalus novaezelandiae Günther, 1861

References

Leptoscopidae
Marine fish genera
Taxa named by Albert Günther